Saint Angelar (died probably soon after 885 AD) was a medieval Bulgarian saint and Slavic enlightener. He was one of the most prominent disciples of Saints Cyril and Methodius. Along with them and Saint Gorazd, Saint Clement of Ohrid, Naum of Preslav and Saint Sava he is venerated as a member of a group known as "Seven Saints". In 868 in Rome he and Saint Sava were ordained as deacons by the bishops Formosus and Gauderic. His fate after 885 when Pope Stephen V forbade the use of the Slavic liturgy and Wiching as Methodius' successor exiled the disciples of the two brothers from Great Moravia remains unclear. He fled together with Saint Clement, Saint Naum and Saint Sava to the First Bulgarian Empire, where he probably died soon afterwards.

Honours
St. Angelariy Peak in Antarctica is named "after the Bulgarian scholar St. Angelariy (9th century AD), a disciple of St. Cyril and St. Methodius."

Notes

Date of birth unknown
Date of death unknown
9th-century Christian saints
Saints of medieval Macedonia
Medieval Bulgarian saints